Giacomo Bassoli (born 19 June 1990) is an Italian footballer who plays as a defender.

Career

Bologna
Born in Bologna, Emilia–Romagna, Giacomo Bassoli started his professional career at Bologna F.C. 1909 along with his twin brother Alessandro. He spent 4 seasons in the reserve league, since 2006–07 season. In 2006–07 season he also played for its student U17 team (Allievi). On 17 August 2010, his apprentice contract was converted to 3-year professional contract. On the same day he also joined Sanremese. In December FIGC fined Sanremese, ordered the club to pay €14,500 to Bologna.

Bologna–Cesena swap
On 29 June 2011, one day before the closure of 2010–11 financial year, Bologna formed two swap deals with A.C. Cesena, which G.Bassoli was transferred to the Romagna along with Jacopo Luppi in co-ownership deal for €1 million and €750,000 respectively. The Emilia club, signed Angelo Gregorio and Kadir Caidi in the same formula. The all four players signed a 3-year contract. The deal made both clubs had an immediately financial boost and a speculative investment.

Lega Pro loans
In July 2011 G.Bassoli left for Santarcangelo in temporary deal (from Cesena/Bologna), along with K.Caidi, Gregorio (from Bologna/Cesena). The club also signed Simone Tonelli from Vicenza/Cesena, which sold by Cesena to Vicenza for another aggressive price in June 2011, and Nicola Del Pivo and Daniele Ferri from Cesena only.

However, G.Bassoli did not made any league appearance in 2011–12 Lega Pro Seconda Divisione. In January 2012, both K.Caidi and G.Bassoli left the club. G.Bassoli was signed by Valenzana, joining Luca Righini, who also sold by Cesena to Vicenza in aggressive price in 2010. Santarcangelo signed Francesco Laezza from Valenzana in the same deal. In the same window, Valenzana also got keeper Aldo Simoncini from Cesena.

In June 2012, the co-ownership deal was renewed. However, he did not receive any call-up for pre-season from Cesena.

After a season without a club, Bologna gave up the remaining 50% registration rights of Bassoli and Luppi, as well as Cesena gave up its portion on Caidi and Gregorio.

On 31 January 2014 he returned to Santarcangelo.

Footnotes

References

External links
 Football.it Profile 

Italian footballers
Bologna F.C. 1909 players
A.C. Cesena players
Santarcangelo Calcio players
Valenzana Mado players
Association football defenders
Footballers from Bologna
1990 births
Living people